East Poland may refer to:

Eastern Poland, a geographical macroregion in Poland
East Region (Poland), a first-level statistical region of Poland
Eastern Borderlands, a former territory of Poland, located to the east of its current territory
East Poland, Maine, an unincorporated village in the town of Poland, Androscoggin County, Maine, United States
East Polish Soviet Socialist Republic, a former proposition for the constituent republic of the Soviet Union

See also 
 Eastern Polans, an East Slavic tribe between the 6th and the 9th centuries